The T-211 is a light aircraft designed in the US by John Thorp in 1945. It is a low-wing monoplane of conventional layout with fixed tricycle undercarriage and a sliding canopy. John Thorp developed the Sky Scooter with lessons learned from developing the Lockheed Little Dipper project in 1944. It bears some family resemblance to the Piper Cherokee, a design that Thorp later contributed to significantly.

Development

Thorp constructed eight prototypes, and had the design certified by the FAA, but was unable to find a foothold in the Cessna-dominated post-war US market. The original prototypes were powered by a 65 hp Lycoming engine. Novel features of the Sky Skooter include an all movable horizontal stabilizer and externally ribbed wings and tailplane. The wings were corrugated to impart stiffness, each wing needing only three internal ribs. This feature simplified construction, reduced the number of rivits (and weight), and helped control the spanwise flow of air over the wings.   The T-211 was developed with a 90-horsepower continental upgrade in 1953. The project was therefore shelved until the homebuilding boom saw the rights to the aircraft acquired first by Adams Industries and then by Thorp Aero in the 1970s, the latter firm building five examples as the Thorp Arrow or T-211 Aero Sport built in Sturgis Kentucky, but only sold overseas or to part 141 operations due to current liability laws. The kits were then manufactured by AD Aerospace in the United Kingdom and Venture Light Aircraft in the United States.

IndUS Aviation began production of the T-211 to the guidelines of Light Sport Aircraft in the mid-2000s. The Thorp T-211 was the first US-designed Special Light Sport Aircraft to receive certification from the Federal Aviation Administration. The light-sport version uses the  Jabiru 3300 engine, while the type certified version uses a  Continental O-200 engine and is equipped for both VFR and IFR flying.

In 2010 the aircraft was also back in production as a kit aircraft by AD Aerospace of Manchester, United Kingdom. This model is powered by a four-cylinder  Continental O-200 or a six-cylinder  Jabiru 3300 powerplant.

Variants
Thorp Sky Skooter
1946
Thorp T-211
1953
Tubular Aircraft Products
1965 - Built 100 parts kits with Continental O-200 powerplants with 11 production models built
Thorp Aero
1983 - Purchased rights and tooling
IndUS Aviation
LSA production in India

Specifications (T-211)

See also

References

External links

 
 IndUS Aviation*  
 FAA Type Certificate Data Sheet for the AD Aerospace T-211

Low-wing aircraft
Homebuilt aircraft
Light-sport aircraft
1940s United States sport aircraft
Single-engined tractor aircraft
Aircraft first flown in 1945